Premium may refer to:

Marketing 
 Premium (marketing), a promotional item that can be received for a small fee when redeeming proofs of purchase that come with or on retail products
 Premium segment, high-price brands or services in marketing, e.g.:
 Premium business model, offering high end products and services
 Premium domain
 Premium email, a marketing term used by for-profit email services
 Premium fare, a higher fare on a public transport service
 Premium gasoline, a grade of gasoline, with the highest octane rating
 Premium lager, marketing term for beer
 Premium Processing Service, service offered by the United States Citizenship and Immigration Services
 Premium Residency, a Saudi residence permit
 Premium station, a class of railway stations on Metlink in Melbourne
 Premium television, a class of subscription-based television service
 Premium texting, SMS used for delivering digital content
 Premium-rate telephone number, telephone numbers for which prices higher than normal are charged

Brands 
 Premium-Cola, a brand of cola from Germany
 Premium Brands Holdings Corporation, a Canadian specialty food manufacturing and distribution company
 Premium Outlets, a brand of shopping malls
 Premium Records, an American record label
 Premium Saltines, a Nabisco brand of saltine crackers

Monetary 
 Risk premium, monetary difference between the guaranteed and possible returns on an investment
 Insurance premium, money charged for coverage in an insurance policy
 Deposit premium, a type of insurance premium
 Option premium, the price of an option
 Premium tax credit, a refundable tax credit in the United States
 Premium Bond, a type of bond available in the United Kingdom
 Buyer's premium, a charge to be paid in addition to the cost of an item

Places 
 Premium, Kentucky, the post office for Hot Spot, Kentucky
 Premium Mill-Pond, mill-pond in Westchester County, New York
 Premium Plaza, Ndola, residential flats building in Zambia
 Premium Plaza, office building in Bucharest, Romania
 Premium River - Pine Brook Wetlands, river in Westchester County, New York

Other uses 
 Premium (film), a 2006 film starring Dorian Missick and Zoe Saldana

See also